Sebastian Toni Deisler (born 5 January 1980) is a German former professional footballer who played as a right midfielder and attacking midfielder.

A Borussia Mönchengladbach youth product, he played one season with the club during which it was relegated from the Bundesliga. He joined Hertha BSC in 1999 before leaving for Bayern Munich in 2002. He also represented the Germany national team between 2000 and 2006.

Having been hailed as the future of German football at the turn of the millennium, Deisler could never manage to reach his full potential due to several cruciate ligament ruptures and other major injuries, as well as depression. Deisler retired from professional football in January 2007 at the age of 27.

Club career

Borussia Mönchengladbach
Deisler joined his first club, FV Turmringen, when he was only six. At age 15, he was scouted and signed by the Bundesliga outfit Borussia Mönchengladbach and played for the club at junior level from 1995 to 1998. He started his professional career at the club in 1998, making his Bundesliga debut against Eintracht Frankfurt on 8 September. During the 1998–99 season he made 17 Bundesliga appearances and scoring one goal, in a 2–0 win over 1860 Munich. However the Foals finished in last place and were relegated to the second division.

Hertha BSC
As Borussia Mönchengladbach were relegated at the end of the season, Deisler moved on to Hertha BSC for 4.5 million DM. The Berlin club offered a participation in the 1999–2000 Champions League. Although only 19 at his arrival and handicapped by a cruciate ligament rupture in 1999, Deisler established himself in the Hertha BSC midfield and was about to become Dariusz Wosz's replacement as the central figure in Hertha's offence when he tore a synovial membrane in his right knee in October 2001 and missed the rest of the season.

Almost simultaneously, German tabloid Bild made known that an agreement had been reached between the player and FC Bayern Munich. Deisler was to join Bayern at the beginning of the 2002–03 season and had received a sum of DEM 20 million from the club. Deisler faced immense critique from the fans and the media for not having announced the agreement earlier as well as accepting the payment. Deisler later stated that he was asked to keep silent by the Hertha BSC manager Dieter Hoeneß to avoid unrest.

During his time at Hertha, Deisler helped the club win the 2001 DFB-Ligapokal.

Bayern Munich

In July 2002, Deisler joined Bayern on a four-year contract. Deisler arrived at Bayern injured as he had injured his right knee the season before. Unfortunately, Deisler's time at the club was a turbulent one as Deisler only managed 62 league appearances in four and a half years. Due to his injuries, he was unable to establish himself as a constant starter over a longer period of time. At the same time, Deisler struggled to endure the pressure he was exposed to at Bayern and developed a depression for which he was treated as a stationary patient in a Munich clinic from November 2003. After several months, Deisler rejoined the squad, but suffered a relapse in October 2004.

Deisler looked to finally break into Bayern's first team from 2004–05 on and was able to play for the most part of 2005. After Michael Ballack's departure to Chelsea, Deisler was about to become the chief in the Bayern midfield. However, he damaged the synovial membrane in his right knee again in March 2006 and missed the World Cup on home soil. Although Deisler came back in November, he felt exhausted and, citing his lack of confidence in ever regaining the necessary stability in his often-injured knee, he announced his retirement on 16 January 2007. Bayern manager Uli Hoeneß stated that Deisler's contract, which ran until 30 June 2009, would not be dissolved but instead be in abeyance. Deisler later stated that he came to the conclusion that he was not made for the football business.

International career
Deisler played for the German national team between 2000 and 2006, winning 36 international caps and scoring three goals. He made his debut for the team in a friendly match against the Netherlands on 23 February 2000 and was also part of the German squad at the Euro 2000 finals four months later, appearing in all three group matches before the Germans disappointingly exited the competition in the first round. On 2 September 2000, he scored his first goal for Germany as he opened their 2–0 win over Greece in the 2002 FIFA World Cup qualifying.

Due to injuries, he missed both the 2002 and 2006 FIFA World Cups, the latter being held in Germany, as well as UEFA Euro 2004. In 2005, he appeared in all of the German team's five matches at the 2005 FIFA Confederations Cup in Germany. His last match for the German national team was a friendly against Italy on 1 March 2006.

Personal life
Deisler has a Brazilian wife named Eunice Dos Santos Santana. The couple have a son named Raphael.

The level of formal education he reached is technical college. He mentions basketball, food, music and movies as his hobbies.

In September 2007, Deisler stated that he was in the process of writing a book. The book was released in 2009.
Now Deisler lives in Freiburg.

Career statistics

Club

International

Scores and results list Germany's goal tally first, score column indicates score after each Deisler goal.

Honours
Hertha BSC
DFB-Ligapokal: 2001

Bayern Munich
Bundesliga: 2002–03, 2004–05, 2005–06
DFB-Pokal: 2002–03, 2004–05, 2005–06
DFB-Ligapokal: 2004
Germany U18
European Under-18 Football Championship runner-up: 1998

Germany
 FIFA Confederations Cup third place: 2005

References

External links

 
 
 
 Observer Sport Extra: Deisler the danger

1980 births
Living people
People from Lörrach
Sportspeople from Freiburg (region)
German footballers
Association football midfielders
FC Bayern Munich footballers
Hertha BSC players
Borussia Mönchengladbach players
Germany international footballers
Germany under-21 international footballers
UEFA Euro 2000 players
2005 FIFA Confederations Cup players
Bundesliga players
Footballers from Baden-Württemberg